Água Clara is a municipality located in the Brazilian state of Mato Grosso do Sul.

Geography 
The municipality of Água Clara is located in the south of the Midwest region of Brazil. It is located at latitude 20º26'53 ” south and longitude 52º52'40” west. It has just over 14,000 inhabitants. It is 204 km from the state capital (Campo Grande) and 868 km from the federal capital (Brasília).

References

Municipalities in Mato Grosso do Sul